Yaduveer Krishnadatta Chamaraja Wadiyar (Kannada: ಯದುವೀರ ಕೃಷ್ಣದತ್ತ ಚಾಮರಾಜ ಒಡೆಯರು, 24 March 1992) is an Indian  royal and the biological great-grandson and adoptive grandson of Maharaja Jayachamarajendra Wadiyar.  He was adopted by Pramoda Devi Wadiyar, the wife of Prince Srikantadatta Wadiyar fourteen months after the latter's demise on 10 December 2013.   

Wadiyar was installed as the "Maharaja of Mysore" in a private ceremony in 2015. Although princely pensions, titles, and privileges are abolished in India, families of former princely rulers have created private roles and styled titles for some within their ranks to preside over family ceremonies and traditions; in some instances, this has been done with a view to sustaining the wealth, fame, and influence that the families possess.

Early life and education
Yaduveer Wadiyar was born Yaduveer Gopal Raj Urs, the only son of Swarup Anand Gopal Raj Urs of Bettada Kote by his wife Leela Tripurasundari Devi of Kallahalli. He has a younger sister, Jayathmika Lakshmi.

Yaduveer's paternal great-grandfather was Sardar Gopalaraj Urs, the eldest brother to Maharaja Chamarajendra Wadiyar X who had been adopted into the royal family by their maternal grandfather Maharaja Krishnaraja Wadiyar III and had ascended the throne in 1868. A closer connection to the royal family exists through Yaduveer's mother, Leela Tripurasundari Devi, who is the daughter of Kantharaj Basavaraj Urs, holder of the Kallahalli feudal estates (under Mysore) and his wife Princess Gayatri Devi, the eldest daughter of Maharaja Jayachamarajendra Wadiyar, making the maharaja his maternal great-grandfather Thus, Yaduveer's maternal grandmother, Gayatri Devi, was a sister of the late Prince Srikantadatta Wadiyar, Yaduveer's adoptive father.

Yaduveer received his education in Bangalore, initially at Vidya Niketan School and then at the Canadian International School. He then obtained an undergraduate degree in English literature and economics from the University of Massachusetts, Amherst.

Accession

Yaduveer Wadiyar's great-uncle Prince Srikantadatta Wadiyar, the previous head of the Wadiyar dynasty, died childless on 10 December 2013 without naming a successor, leaving the family headship vacant. As per the traditions of the family, and in accordance with Hindu customs, it was left to his widow, now the queen mother, Pramoda Devi, to adopt an heir to assume the position of head of the family. She and other members of the family, as also the former senior nobility of the state, pondered the question for over a year. During this interregnum, no celebrations or non-religious observances of any kind were held at the palace, except for the rituals connected to Dasara, which, according to traditions, are never deferred even by the death of the head of the family owing to its connection to honouring in the palace Goddess Chamundi (an avatar of Durga), the presiding deity of Mysore. On this occasion, the "royal sword"  was used to represent the majesty of the late head of the family and the rituals were conducted under this instrument of continuity.

The interregnum lasted for more than one year, during which Pramoda Devi held consultations with members of the family, the raja gurus and priesthood from the Parakala Matha who traditionally advise the head of the family, and with important members of the erstwhile nobility of Mysore. Finally, on 12 February 2015, fourteen months after the death of her husband, the Pramoda Devi held a press conference at the Palace and announced the name of her 'adopted son designate', Yaduveer Gopalaraja Urs, son of Swaroop Anand Gopalraj Urs of Bettada Kote; Yaduveer is a grandson of Princess Gayatri Devi, the deceased eldest sister of the late head of family. This choice had met with the consent of almost every member of the family, as also of the other eminences temporal and spiritual whose opinion had been sought.

The announcement was met with both relief and acclaim across Old Mysore, where people were becoming disturbed at the unprecedented length of the interregnum. The monarchy does not have formal existence at present; the state had been merged with the Dominion of India in 1948 and the residual titles and privileges of the titular Maharaja had been taken away by the government of India in 1971. The idea was shocking to the inhabitants of the state, who continue to have a strong emotional resonance with the erstwhile royal family.

Srikantadatta Wadiyar had continued to play a pivotal role in religious and social ceremonies, and the family is a lodestar and fountainhead of honour for many talented performing artists, musicians, and craftsmen; it continues to have an important role in the cultural life of Karnataka. Pramoda Devi announced that the customs and traditions of the family, and its bond with the people, would continue as before. Nevertheless, some slight controversy did arise at the time of Yaduveer's adoption.

Pramoda Devi formally adopted Yaduveer in a ceremony on 23 February 2015.  The ceremony was a private affair, attended among many by the presiding chief minister Siddaramaiah, followed by a public procession late in the evening. This adoption made him the son of Srikantadatta Wadiyar and Pramoda Devi Wadiyar, and he was formally renamed Yaduveer Krishnadatta Chamaraja Wadiyar.

Personal life
With his anointment ceremony on 28 May 2015, Yaduveer became, at 23, the twenty-seventh head of the erstwhile royal family of the Kingdom of Mysore, one of the richest Indian royal families. He conducted his first Dasara durbar in September 2015.

On 27 June 2016, over a year after his appointment, Yaduveer Wadiyar married Trishikha Kumari Devi, daughter of Harshvardhan Singh and Maheshree Kumari of the erstwhile Dungarpur royal family from Rajasthan. Trishikha gave birth to a boy, Aadyaveer Narasimharaja Wadiyar, on 6 December 2017 in Bangalore.

References

External links

 Official Mysore Palace Website
 Yaduveer Krishnadatta Chamaraja Wadiyar

1992 births
20th-century Indian monarchs
Kings of Mysore
Living people
People of the Kingdom of Mysore
Politicians from Bangalore
University of Massachusetts Amherst College of Social and Behavioral Sciences alumni
University of Massachusetts Amherst alumni
Yaduveera